Juan Manuel García-Gallardo Frings (born 18 March 1991) is a Spanish lawyer and politician of the Vox party. He led the party in the 2022 Castilian-Leonese regional election, in which they became the third-biggest group in the Cortes of Castile and León. They formed government with the People's Party and he became Vice President.

Early life
Born in Burgos, García-Gallardo studied the Bachelor's degree in Law at the Comillas Pontifical University with a diploma in International Legal Studies (2009–2014) and took the master's degree in Legal Practice and a master's degree in Business Law from the University of Deusto (2013–2014).  After passing the Spanish Bar Examination, he obtained the title of lawyer (licence). He won regional titles in horse riding, and took part in the debating world championship in Madrid in 2013. In December 2016 he joined the law firm of his grandfather and father, both also named Juan Manuel.

Political career
In January 2022, García-Gallardo was announced as the lead candidate for Vox in snap elections to the Cortes of Castile and León. He had joined the party only the previous June. Soon after his nomination, he deleted historical tweets that he had made about LGBT people, feminists, Romani and immigrants; in 2011 he had written "It seems a good idea to me to bring back Raúl for the Euros. We need to heterosexualise this sport that's full of faggots". He defended this particular remark as "a football joke when I didn't even have a moustache".

During the campaign, he pledged to align with the governing People's Party (PP), whom he considered to be "addicted to power". He said that there would be no alliance unless the PP enacted Vox's policies, which included financial incentives to increase the birth rate in the region.

In the election, Vox rose from one deputy to 13, with 17% of the vote, making it the third biggest party in the legislature. García-Gallardo told regional president Alfonso Fernández Mañueco (PP) that he would only form a coalition if two regional laws were repealed: a 2010 law on gender violence that Vox considers to be politically motivated and neglectful other forms of violence, and a 2018 law of historical memory that would allocate funds to associations for victims of Francisco Franco.

On 10 March 2022, Mañueco formed a coalition government with Vox, with Vox having three of the ten ministers including García-Gallardo as vice president. The law on gender violence that Vox had criticised was replaced by a law on domestic violence regardless of gender, as the party had demanded. It was the first far-right entrance into a government in Spain since the transition to democracy from 1975 onwards.

In May 2022, García-Gallardo caused controversy in a discussion with Noelia Frutos in the Cortes. The discussion was on women and disabilities, and the Spanish Socialist Workers' Party (PSOE) deputy has dwarfism and uses a wheelchair.  García-Gallardo had said "Look Mrs Frutos, I am not going to condescend to you and I am going to respond to your lack of respect as if you were a person like any other, not how your parliamentary group does, as I will expand upon later". He said that his statement was about meritocracy and it was being manipulated by his political rivals.

García-Gallardo proposed legislation in January 2023 that would mandate abortion clinics to offer an ultrasound scan or a chance to listen to the fetal heartbeat before the procedure. The measures were overturned by the PP after the PSOE-led central government threatened to block it in the courts or bring about direct rule in Castile and León as a final resort. Leading PP figures such as President of the Community of Madrid Isabel Díaz Ayuso and Campaign Committee president Borja Sémper criticised the measures as needlessly provocative. He also proposes the abolition of regional laws against gender violence on the grounds that such legislation is "an anomaly in the civilised world" and on the idea that "heartless women file false complaints".

References

1991 births
Living people
People from Burgos
Comillas Pontifical University alumni
University of Deusto alumni
21st-century Spanish lawyers
Vox (political party) politicians
Members of the 11th Cortes of Castile and León
Government ministers of Castile and León